The Escambia map turtle (Graptemys ernsti), also known commonly as Ernst's map turtle, is a species of turtle in the family Emydidae. The species is endemic to the United States.

Geographic range
G. ernsti is found in southern Alabama and western Florida, in rivers which drain into Escambia Bay.

Habitat
The preferred natural habitat of G. ernsti is flowing fresh water, in medium to large creeks and rivers.

Etymology
The specific name, ernsti, is in honor of American herpetologist Dr. Carl Henry Ernst.

Description
Females of G. ernsti are larger than males.

Diet
The diet of G. ernsti varies according to age and gender. Males and juveniles prey predominately upon insects, but females prey almost entirely upon snails and clams, including the invasive species Corbicula fluminea.

Reproduction
Males of G. ernsti reach sexual maturity at an age of 3–4 years, but females don't reach sexual maturity until an age of 14–19 years. Each sexually mature female lays an average of 4 clutches a year, with an average clutch size of 7 eggs. 

References

Further reading
Ennen JR, Godwin J, Lovich JE, Kreiser BR, Folt B, Hazzard S (2016). "Interdrainage Morphological and Genetic Differentiation in the Escambia Map Turtle, Graptemys ernsti ". Herpetological Conservation & Biology 11 (1): 122–131.
Lovich JE, McCoy CJ (1992). "Review of the Graptemys pulchra Group (Reptilia: Testudines: Emydidae), with Descriptions of Two New Species". Annals of Carnegie Museum 61 (4): 293–315. ("Grapemys ernsti'', new species", pp. 300–302, Figures 4–5).

External links
Tortoise and Freshwater Turtle Specialist Group (1996). Graptemys ernsti.   2006 IUCN Red List of Threatened Species.   Retrieved 29 July 2007.

Graptemys
Reptiles of the United States
Reptiles described in 1992
Taxonomy articles created by Polbot